Iosu Iglesias Otxandategi (born 15 December 1976 in Bilbao, Biscay) is a Spanish retired footballer who played as a right-back.

External links

1976 births
Living people
Spanish footballers
Footballers from Bilbao
Association football defenders
Segunda División players
Segunda División B players
Tercera División players
SD Amorebieta footballers
SD Lemona footballers
Barakaldo CF footballers
Real Unión footballers
Zamudio SD players